Novonikolayevka is a rural locality (a village) in Bazhenovsky Selsoviet, Belebeyevsky District, Bashkortostan, Russia. The population was 54 as of 2010. There is 1 street.

Geography 
Novonikolayevka is located 20 km southwest of Belebey (the district's administrative centre) by road. Yekaterinovka is the nearest rural locality.

References 

Rural localities in Belebeyevsky District